The 2019–20 North Carolina Tar Heels men's basketball team represented the University of North Carolina at Chapel Hill during the 2019–20 NCAA Division I men's basketball season. The team's head coach is Roy Williams, who was in his 17th season as UNC's head men's basketball coach. The Tar Heels played their home games at the Dean Smith Center in Chapel Hill, North Carolina as members of the Atlantic Coast Conference.

The Tar Heels finished the season 14–19, and 6–14 in ACC play.  They defeated Virginia Tech in the first round of the ACC tournament before losing to Syracuse in the second round.  The tournament was cancelled before the quarterfinals due to the COVID-19 pandemic.  The NCAA tournament and NIT were also cancelled due to the pandemic.

Previous season
The Tar Heels finished the season 29–7, 16–2 in ACC play to finish tied for the regular season conference championship with eventual NCAA tournament champions Virginia. As the No. 2 seed in the ACC tournament, they advanced to the semifinals before ultimately losing to Duke. They received an at-large bid to the NCAA Tournament as the No. 1 seed in the Midwest region, where they advanced to the Sweet Sixteen before losing to Auburn.

Offseason

Departures

2019 recruiting class

Incoming transfers

Roster

Schedule and results

|-
!colspan=12 style=|Exhibition

|-
!colspan=12 style=|Regular season

|-
!colspan=12 style=|ACC tournament

Rankings

*AP does not release post-NCAA Tournament ranking*No Coaches Poll Week 1

References

North Carolina Tar Heels men's basketball seasons
North Carolina
Tar